Alexander Zverev defeated Stefan Kozlov in the final, 6–3, 6–0 to win the boys' singles tennis title at the 2014 Australian Open.

Nick Kyrgios was the reigning champion, but was ineligible to play in junior events.

Seeds

Draw

Finals

Top half

Section 1

Section 2

Bottom half

Section 3

Section 4

References

External links 
 Main draw

Boys' Singles
Australian Open, 2014 Boy's Singles